Pir Syed Nazim Hussain Shah is a Pakistani politician. He served as a politician in Pakistan Peoples Party (PPP) since 1988.

Political career 
He was elected in the 1988 Pakistani general election to the National Assembly as a candidate of Pakistan Peoples Party (PPP) against Pakistan Muslim League (N). He was re-elected to the National Assembly as a candidate of PPP in the 1990 Pakistani general election, the 2008 Pakistani general election, and the 2018 Pakistani general election. This was his last election in Pakistan Peoples Party Team.

References

Year of birth missing (living people)
Living people